Agyneta flavipes is a species of sheet weaver found in Japan. It was described by Ono in 1991.

References

flavipes
Chelicerates of Japan
Spiders of Asia
Spiders described in 1991